Oscar O'Neill Oxholm may refer to:
 Oscar O'Neill Oxholm (1809–1871), Danish military officer, chamberlain and landowner
 Oscar O'Neill Oxholm (diplomat) (1889–1949), Danish diplomat